The 1981–82 Louisville Cardinals men's basketball team represented the University of Louisville during the 1981-82 NCAA Division I men's basketball season, Louisville's 69th season of intercollegiate competition. The Cardinals competed in the Metro Conference and were coached by Denny Crum, who was in his eleventh season.  The team played its home games at Freedom Hall.

Louisville defeated Alabama Birmingham 75–68 to win the NCAA tournament Mideast Regional and advance to the Final Four (their 5th) where they fell to eventual runner-up Georgetown 50–46. The Cardinals finished with a 23–10 (8–4) record.

Roster

Schedule

NCAA tournament

Mideast region

Final four

References

Louisville Cardinals men's basketball seasons
Louisville
NCAA Division I men's basketball tournament Final Four seasons
Louisville
Louisville Cardinals men's basketball, 1981-82
Louisville Cardinals men's basketball, 1981-82